Posyolok Ilyicha is a rural locality (a settlement) in Zudilovsky Selsoviet, Pervomaysky District, Altai Krai, Russia. The population was 505 as of 2013. There are 5 streets.

Geography 
Posyolok Ilyicha is located 24 km north of Novoaltaysk (the district's administrative centre) by road.

References 

Rural localities in Pervomaysky District, Altai Krai